The Trial is a 1925 novel by Franz Kafka.

The Trial may also refer to:

Films

Adaptations of Kafka's novel
 The Trial (1962 film), a French-Italian-German film directed by Orson Welles and starring Anthony Perkins
 The Trial (1993 film), a British film directed by David Hugh Jones and starring Kyle MacLachlan and Anthony Hopkins

Other films
 The Trial (1948 film), an Austrian film directed by Georg Wilhelm Pabst and based on the Tiszaeszlár affair
 The Trial (2006 film), a Peruvian film directed by Judith Vélez
 The Trial (2009 film), an Irish documentary on the trial of Kosovo's former prime minister Ramush Haradinaj for war crimes
 The Trial (2010 film), an American film directed by Gary Wheeler and based on the novel by Robert Whitlow
 The Trial (2014 film), a Filipino film directed by Chito S. Rono
 The Trial: The State of Russia vs Oleg Sentsov, a Polish-Czech-Estonian documentary film by Askold Kurov

Music
 The TRIAL (band), a 1990s synthpop band from the Czech Republic
 The Trial (band), a German-Turkish-Swiss alternative/experimental band
 "The Trial" (song), a song from the 1979 Pink Floyd album The Wall

Television
 The Trial (TV series), a 2019 Italian TV series

Episodes
 "The Trial" (Angel)
 "The Trial" (The Colbys)
 "The Trial" (Dilbert)
 "The Trial" (Dynasty 1984)
 "The Trial" (Dynasty 1986)
 "The Trial" (Dynasty 1988)
 "The Trial" (My Name Is Earl)
 "The Trial" (Recess)
 "The Trial" (Rugrats)
 "The Trial" (Steven Universe)
 "The Trial", an unproduced episode of Invader Zim

Other uses in arts, entertainment, and media
An Triail, Irish-language play, unrelated to the Kafka novel
 The Trial (painting), Sidney Nolan's 1947 painting of Ned Kelly's trial

See also
Trial (disambiguation)
Tryall, a British East India Company-owned ship